Andrea Holíková defeated Jenny Byrne in the final, 7–5, 6–1 to win the girls' singles tennis title at the 1985 Wimbledon Championships.

Seeds

  Helen Kelesi (semifinals)
  Laura Garrone (second round)
  Andrea Holíková (champion)
  Janine Thompson (second round)
  Mary Joe Fernández (semifinals)
  Elna Reinach (quarterfinals)
  Jenny Byrne (final)
  Helena Dahlström (quarterfinals)

Draw

Finals

Top half

Section 1

Section 2

Bottom half

Section 3

Section 4

References

External links

Girls' Singles
Wimbledon Championship by year – Girls' singles